USS Whirlwind (PC-11) is the eleventh . Whirlwind was laid down 4 March 1994 by Bollinger Shipyards, Lockport, Louisiana and launched 9 September 1994. She was commissioned 1 July 1995 in Memphis, Tennessee. On 21 March 2022, Whirlwind was decommissioned at Naval Support Activity Bahrain.

References

External links

FAS

 

Cyclone-class patrol ships
Ships built in Lockport, Louisiana
1994 ships